The Kopassus (Special Forces Command) is an Indonesian Army (TNI-AD) special forces group that conducts special operations missions for the Indonesian government, such as direct action, unconventional warfare, sabotage, counter-insurgency, counter-terrorism, intelligence gathering and special reconnaissance (SR). Kopassus was founded by Alexander Evert Kawilarang and Mochammad Idjon Djanbi on 16 April 1952. It gained worldwide attention after several operations such as the Indonesian invasion of East Timor and the release of hostages from Garuda Indonesia Flight 206.

The special forces spearheaded some of the government's military campaigns: putting down regional rebellions in the late 1950s, the Operation Trikora (Western New Guinea campaign) in 1961–1962, the Indonesia-Malaysia Confrontation from 1962–1966, the massacres of alleged communists in 1965, the East Timor invasion in 1975, and subsequent campaigns against separatists in various provinces.

Kopassus has been reported by national and international media, human rights-affiliated NGOs and researchers to have committed violations of human rights in East Timor, Aceh, Papua and Java. In 2019, the United States announced that it would conduct a combined exercise training with Kopassus in 2020. The US had ended links with Kopassus in 1999 as the Leahy Law banned assistance to foreign military units with a history of human rights violations until those responsible are prosecuted. Kopassus has introduced internal reforms and undertaken human rights courses with the International Committee of the Red Cross. In 2018, US Secretary of Defense Jim Mattis said he wanted to lift the ban as Kopassus had reformed and removed human rights abusive soldiers. In response, Senator Patrick Leahy said Mattis needs to establish whether Kopassus has punished officers and is today "accountable to the rule of law". Human Rights Watch criticised plans to lift the ban as Kopassus officers had not been prosecuted.

History
On 15 April 1952, Colonel Alexander Evert Kawilarang began to form , the early name of Kopassus and the basis for this historic special forces unit.

Not long after, Colonel Kawilarang with the use of military intelligence located and met with Major Rokus Bernardus Visser—a former member of the Dutch Special Forces who had remained in newly independent Indonesia, settled in West Java, married an Indonesian woman, and was known locally as Mochammad Idjon Djanbi. He was the first recruit for the Indonesian special forces, as well as its first commander. Due to him, the unit which later became Kopassus wear red berets (color traditionally favored by airborne troops in Europe) instead of the distinctive green beret.

The first generation of this force was only around a hundred soldiers or one company, headquartered in Bandung. Among its pioneer instructors was a young veteran of the Indonesian National Revolution, future Minister of Defense Leonardus Benjamin Moerdani, who later became a battalion commander and later led his paratroopers to crush the two twin rebellions in 1957-58 by the Revolutionary Government of the Republic of Indonesia and Permesta.

As the RPKAD, a name used in the 1960s, and expanded into a three-battalion special forces airborne regiment, the force was involved in the widespread killings during General Suharto's rise to power. An estimated half-a million people were killed in the anti-communist purge with strong communal overtones.

The RPKAD was involved in wiping out entire villages such as Kesiman (east of Denpasar) in Bali, many of them in beach areas which later becomes major tourist resorts.

The unit also saw action during the Indonesia-Malaysia Confrontation when in 1965, Indonesia launched a war for control of North Borneo (Sabah/Sarawak) during Malaysian independence, particularly in the Battle of Sungei Koemba In 1981, with Moerdani yet again at the lead, a Kopassandha company was deployed to Bangkok as part of the efforts to rescue Garuda Indonesia Flight 206 from hijackers.

In 2017 Kopassus was sent to Afghanistan to guard the Indonesia embassy in Kabul, Afghanistan.

Organization

Kopassus organizational structure is different from the infantry units in general. Although Kopassus members generally came from the Infantry Corps, Kopassus created its own structure, which is different from infantry units.

Kopassus units intentionally do not use the nomenclature of standard infantry units. This is apparent in their units called Groups. With this unit, Kopassus can deploy a brigade plus size (about 5,000 personnel), or fewer.

There are five groups of Kopassus which are:
Special Forces Training and Education Center - located in Batujajar, West Java.
Group 1 Para Commandos. Headquarters at Kartasura, Central Java.
Group 2 Para Commandos. Headquarters at Serang, Banten.
Group 4 Sandi Yudha (Clandestine). Headquarters at Cijantung, Jakarta.
SAT-81 Gultor Counter-terrorism Group. Headquarters at Cijantung, Jakarta.

Except for Pusdikpassus, which serves as an educational center, other Groups have combat oriented operational functions. Each Group (except Pusdikpassus) is subdivided into battalions.

Group 1 Para Commandos

Group 1 Para Commandos is a unit of Brigade level which is part of the Army Special Forces Command and was established on 23 March 1963. The group was first commanded by Major L.B. Moerdani. It has a total of 3,274 personnel. The unit's internal organization consists of the group headquarters and four battalions which are:
11th Battalion / "Atulo Sena Bhaladhika" 
12th Battalion / "Asabha Sena Baladhika"
13th Battalion / "Thikkaviro Sena Bhaladhika"
14th Battalion / "Bhadrika Sena Bhaladhika"

Each battalion consists of 3 companies. Each company is broken into 3 platoons, each of which consisted of 39 people. And each platoon consists of 3 small units called a squad of 10 men. The 1st Group, with its 4 battalions, is the largest brigade of the Kopassus.

Group 2 Para Commandos
Group 2 Para Commando is a unit of Brigade level, which is part of the Special Forces Command of the Army and was established in 1962. The group was first commanded by Major Soegiarto. The unit's internal organization are as follows:
Group HQ
21st Battalion / "Buhpala Yudha" 
22nd Battalion / "Manggala Yudha"
23rd Battalion / "Dhanuja Yudha" - located in Parung, Bogor

Like "Group 1", "Group 2" has the main tasks and responsibilities for missions such as Airborne assault, Jungle warfare, Unconventional Warfare, Counter-insurgency, Special Reconnaissance, and Direct Action.

Special Forces Training and Education Center
The Special Forces Training and Education Center abbreviated "Pusdiklatpassus" is the training and education center for recruits and personnel associated with and becoming to join as Commandos in the Army Special Forces Command (Kopassus). As an educational institution, "Pusdiklatpassus" is divided based on its training function. Supervises nine schools of education and training including:
Para School
Commando School
Sandhi Yudha (Intelligence) School
School of Specialized Warfare 
Specialization School
Raider School
It provides other specialist courses, which are also open to members of the Army out of Kopassus such as: Hunting Company, Scuba, Rock-climbing, Demolition, Path-Finder and Sniper.

Commando Training

The Commando education and training lasts for approximately seven months (28 weeks) which is divided into three stages. The first phase of the implementation of the education is conducted on the base for 18 weeks, the second stage all participants will be released in the forest and the mountains twice each for 6 weeks, and the next stage of the third stage ends with a 4-week sea-swamp stage. The 97th batch of the Commando Education had first initial participants as many as 251 personnel, who successfully passed through commando education and inaugurated as a special forces commando of 214 personnel. Phases are as shown below:

Phase I (Base training)
10 Weeks with individual ability points in Batujajar. Establish attitudes & personality, fill in technical skills, Command Operation tactics, Individual & basic capabilities of urban battle, Support knowledge, Field managerial, and individual ability test.

Phase II (Forest and Mountain)
6 Weeks with Counter Insurgency emphasis, Jungle warfare and Raid warfare in Situ Lembang. Stabilization of forest observations, individual abilities in the forest / Basic battle techniques, forest capabilities in group relations, forest HTF, and durability of long march application (LRRP).

Phase III (Swamp and Sea)
4 Weeks with heavy Commando operation tactics, sea battle tactics in Cilacap and Nusakambangan. Conservation observation of Sea-swamp, patrol ability, swamp terrain knowledge and Resistance to Interrogation test.

"Kopassus" has graduated students from the Commando Education up to 100 batches. In the year 2016 followed by 153 commando students, which consists of ranks of 41 Officers, 101 NCOs, and 11 Enlisted. The command officers who successfully complete the 7-month Command Course well are entitled to wear the qualified commando brevet issued to their clothing/uniform.

Aside from Kopassus commandos, the Pusdiklatpassus also trains SF-ready combat personnel of the Army Raider Infantry battalions within the structure of the territorial region commands or KODAMs Army-wide and within Kostrad component units.

Group 3 Combat Intelligence
Group 3 / Sandhi Yudha is a Kopassus unit that has the specification of "Clandestine operation" 'secret warfare', including combat Intel and counter-insurgency. Group 3 was formed on 24 July 1967, headquartered at Cijantung Kopassus Headquarters, East Jakarta. Prospective Personnel in this Group are strictly selected internally ranging from prospective soldiers who are still educated to personnel who have active duty in unity but have an intelligence talent that will then be trained again. The Group is organized as follows:
Group HQ
31st Battalion/Eka Sandhi Yudha Utama
32nd Battalion/Apta Sandhi Prayudha Utama
33rd Battalion/Wira Sandhi Yudha Sakti

Conducted Training
The basic training is the same as other Kopassus soldiers (2.5 months), Command School (7 months) plus other courses such as Jungle Warfare, Close Combat, Special combat school and Climber, but after that the candidates of combat-intelligence is educated more specifically for the education of "Sandhi Yudha" in "Pusdiklatassus" located in Batujajar whose education materials are intelligence and supporting knowledge for intelligence in the field of operation such as disguise, navigation, special martial, Special tools of intelligence and others. Even some selected personnel from this Group are sent abroad to schools of Military Intelligence Education Centers such as in the United States, Germany, Britain and even Israel. Among all types of soldiers in "Kopassus", the most specific form of education and training is the Group 3 / Sandhi Yudha combat intelligence unit.

SAT-81 Gultor Counter-terrorism group

Unit 81 / Counter Terror or abbreviated as Sat-81 / Gultor is a unit in Kopassus which is equivalent to a group level formation and is composed of the best chosen personnel within the whole of the Indonesian Army special forces. The strength of this unit is not publicly publicized on the number of personnel or types of weapons. The Sat 81 Gultor is incorporated in the BNPT Crisis Control Center ("Pusdalsis") which consists of a combination of special units, such as the Denjaka from the Indonesian Navy, the Bravo Detachment 90 of the Indonesian Air Force, and the 1st Gegana Command of the Brimob Corps, Indonesian National Police. "Pusdalsis" is organized of a combination of elite units within the Indonesian National Armed Forces and Police which is assigned as a counter-terrorist formation to be sent when the activities of terrorism may be conducted such as aircraft hijacking. The regiment is organized into a group HQ and two Special Forces Battalions:

811th Special Action Battalion / Wega Yogya Gabhira 
812th Support Battalion / Wira Drdha Ghabira

Recruitment is done by choosing from members which at least have 2 years of active service in the groups of the Kopassus organization, and must complete 6 months of Counter Terrorism Selection and Reinforcement Training before being assigned.

Command Structure

Training
The unit actively conduct training and joint operation with United States Army Special Forces, SFOD-D, Special Air Service Regiment, CIA, MOSSAD, GSG9.

Kopassus participates in bilateral training exercises with international partners. After resuming military ties in 2003, Australia's special operations unit, the Special Air Service Regiment, conducts an annual counter terrorism exercise, with Australia and Indonesia taking turns to host the event.

In July 2011, Kopassus and Chinese special forces held a joint counter terrorism exercise called Exercise Sharp Knife, held in Bandung, Java. In July 2012, Exercise Sharp Knife II was held in Jinan, China.

In 2015, Kopassus and South Korea 707th Special Mission Battalion held a joint counter terrorism exercise in South Korea.

On 19 February 2018, Kopassus and 9 Para SF held a joint exercise called Garuda Sakti in Cipatat, Bandung.

On 7 February 2019, Kopassus and Special Service Group held a joint counter terrorism exercise called Elang Strike in Pabbi, Pakistan.

In May 2019, former Secretary of Defense Ryamizard Ryacudu and United States Acting Secretary of Defense Patrick M. Shanahan announced a joint combined exercise training in 2020. The exercise to be held in Indonesia would focus on combat medic training.

In February 2020, the Asia Times reported that Kopassus recently took part in a full–on combat training exercise with the United States 1st Special Forces Command (Airborne) at Fort Bragg, United States, and that it was the first combat training exercise with the US since a 15-year military embargo was lifted in 2005.

In November 2021, the 1st Scout Ranger Regiment have conducted joint training with Kopassus operators.

Uniform and Attributes

Brief History of Kopassus Attributes
The Kopassus (then RPKAD) red beret was first used in 1954-1968 and was designed by Lieutenant Dodo Sukamto. It was first used during a ceremony on 5 October 1954. This emblem consists of a bayonet, anchors representing abilities in the sea and wings as high mobility. The beret emblem used in 1968 until now with slight changes from the initial design, the bayonet is more slender than the Commando knife and the wingspan is more wing coat like the Wing of the Army designs. The iconic Kopassus Camouflage pattern called Loreng Darah Mengalir (Flowing Blood pattern), introduced in 1964 pattern was originally intended to be a copy of the WW2 era British Denison brushstroke camouflage for issue to the RPKAD. However, an error at the original manufacturing plant resulted in the vertical, vine-like stripes that characterize this unique pattern. The original version illustrated, with some variation in color and type of fabric, saw service between 1964 and 1986 (at which time the entire Armed Forces were outfitted in a copy of British DPM). The second pattern shown was revived for issue to Kopassus in 1995 but in a slightly varied design, worn for ceremonial & training purposes only. For other purpose regular TNI patern (DPM) was used instead.

Commando Brevet
The Commando qualification brevet used since 1966 until now was designed by Major Djajadiningrat. This brevet is used by all graduates of Commando training and Education from Batujajar. Colonel Sarwo Edhie Wibowo used the new Commando Brevet qualification to show the public of the Corps' new appearance on 4 January 1966 during a Army-organized open house event at the grounds of the Gelora Bung Karno Sports Complex, which, among others, featured a mass jump of Kopassus parachute commandos and operators in front of watching crowds.

Paratrooper Badges

Jump Master Wings

Jump Master Wings are issued to commandos of Kopassus who have graduated from advanced paratrooper jump master courses conducted by the Commando training and educational center.

Free Fall Wing
The Kopassus (RPKAD) military freefall wing insignia, designed by HH.Djajadiningrat and first issued in 1962 depicts a free fall paratrooper hanging under a circle consisting of small parachutes. Stated by the first free fall instructors of the Yugoslavia: Mladen Milicetic, Stoyan Jovic and Dobel Stanej in Bandung during the first free fall graduation ceremony of Kopassus (RPKAD) on 26 October 1962.

Issues

Human rights accusations
Kopassus has been accused by NGOs, Western politicians, and researchers of human rights violations. Amnesty International and Indonesian human rights groups including the official National Commission on Human Rights (Komnas HAM) have cited abuses by members of Kopassus.

Kopassus has also been associated with illegal economic activities, like involvement in the trade of Agarwood and illegal gold mining in West Papua and other areas, and the trade in drugs.

In 1975, five Australian journalists, known as the Balibo Five, were killed by members of Kopassus in the town of Balibo during the Indonesian invasion of East Timor. The Indonesian military has always maintained that the men were killed in a cross-fire during the battle for the town.

Arnold Ap was a West Papuan cultural leader, anthropologist and musician. Arnold was the leader of the group Mambesak, and Curator of the Cenderawasih University Museum. In November 1983, he was arrested by Kopassus and imprisoned and tortured for suspected sympathies with the Free Papua Movement, although no charges were laid. In April 1984, he was killed by a gunshot to his back.  Official accounts claim he was trying to escape. Many supporters believe Ap was executed by Kopassus. Another musician, Eddie Mofu, was also killed.

Between 1997 and 1998, Kopassus members from Tim Mawar (Rose Team) were responsible for pro-democracy activists kidnappings of at least 22 people mainly in Jakarta. Nine activists were released and 13 remain missing. In 1999, 11 members of Tim Mawar were found guilty by a military court. However, they appealed the verdict to the Supreme Court, which was not made public and only revealed in 2007, and were never jailed and all but one remained in the military. In September 2020, Defence Minister Prabowo Subianto appointed two of the Tim Mawar officers, two serving Brigadier generals, to senior positions in the Ministry of Defense following approval by President Joko Widodo. Amnesty International criticised the appointments as the President and the DPR had promised to investigate missing activist cases and instead placed suspects in positions of power.

The United Nations Report of the International Commission of Inquiry on East Timor found there was evidence that Kopassus in 1999 engaged militias to conduct intimidation and terror tasks in order to influence the outcome of the independence referendum.

In 2001, four Kopassus members were convicted of the strangulation of Theys Eluay, the former chairman of the Papua Presidium Council. They were part of a group which had killed Theys after ambushing him and his driver. The group's leader, Lt-Col Hatono, and another soldier received prison sentences of three and a half years while two others received three years. A further two officers had their charges dismissed. The men were all Kopassus members from Group V (Jakarta) and were not based in Jayapura or West Papua. They faced a court-martial, which found them not guilty on the more serious charges of premeditated murder, because the Kopassus are legally exempt from the jurisdiction of civil law. Indonesian Army Chief, General Ryamizard Ryacudu (2002–05), accepted the men had to be prosecuted "because Indonesia is a State based on law" but he affirmed their defence's view that they were heroes who had killed a rebel leader.

In 2002, Kopassus is accused of killing three teachers (two of whom were American and one Indonesian) and wounding 12 others in an ambush in August near the Freeport mine. For this, the US Congress extended its existing ban on contact with the Indonesian military. There is also suspicion that the attack was aimed at blackmailing mine owners into paying protection money. From 2000 to 2002, Freeport-McMoRan paid the TNI $10.7 million in protection money, but the company shut down the payments shortly before the ambush.

In 2003, Laskar Jihad fighters have been trained by Kopassus in a training camp near Bogor in West Java. Laskar Jihad members even received military escorts while travelling from West Java to Surabaya. The behaviour of the military in Maluku was similarly biased. Although at first a newly created military unit, the Joint Battalion, took action against Laskar Jihad in Maluku, it was replaced in mid-2001 by Kopassus, which was more sympathetic towards the militia.

Some international partners have severed military ties with Kopassus in response to allegations of human rights abuses. For example, Australia ceased training with Kopassus in September 1999 in relation to Kopassus' role in violence in East Timor. In early 2006, Australia resumed training exercises with Unit 81 focused on "skills required to conduct counter-hijack and hostage recovery operations" having earlier re-newed links in 2003 with the last similar exercise held in 1997. The United States re-newed links with Kopassus in 2010 after President Susilo Bambang Yudhoyono advised the Obama administration it was the "litmus test of the bilateral relationship" after intense lobbying over four years to lift the 1999 ban. Secretary of Defense Robert Gates said it would be a limited program of cooperation "within the limits of U.S. law" that could be expanded dependent upon continued implementation of human-rights reform including suspending members of the military accused of human-rights abuses, discharging members convicted of abuses and prosecuting members who have violated human-rights. In response, thirteen US Congress members wrote to the Secretary of State and the Defense Secretary that they had serious concerns.

Criminal conduct
In 1996 a member of Kopassus known as Sanurip suffering from depression went on a rampage and killed 16 (11 military and 5 civilians) and injured 11 others. He was later sentenced to death.

In March 2013, twelve Kopassus members wearing ski masks and armed with AK-47 rifles raided the Cebongan Prison near Yogyakarta which housed four prisoners charged with murdering their superior officer three days earlier in a nightclub brawl. The members threatened and beat 12 prisons guards and a member fatally shot the four prisoners. The member who shot the four was found guilty of murder in a military court and sentenced to eleven years and two other members who supplied the weapons and stood next to him as he shot received six and eight years sentences. Three of the twelve members tried and sentenced in the military court were dishonorably discharged.

In September 2015, the Army Chief of Staff General Mulyono at a ceremony at the Kopassus headquarters, stated that "There are still soldiers from the Indonesian Army who taint the name of their force and the Army with their arrogant and selfish attitudes … by engaging in misdeeds or even acting against the law". Kopassus members had months earlier been involved in two incidents:

 June 2015: Kopassus members were involved in a brawl with Indonesian Air Force members at a karaoke parlour in Sukoharjo, resulting in the death of an Air Force member. Five Kopassus members were tried for violence resulting in death in November 2015.
 July 2015: A Kopassus member was arrested for his suspected involvement in the kidnapping of a Malaysian businessman.

Equipment

Small arms 
 
 Accuracy International AW
 AK-47
 Benelli M3T
 Beretta 92SB / Beretta 92F
 Browning Hi-Power
 Carl Gustaf 8.4cm recoilless rifle
 Colt 1911
 Colt M16A2
 Colt M4
 FN Herstal Five-Seven
 FN Herstal MAG
 FN Herstal Minimi
 FN Herstal P90
 Franchi SPAS-12
 Glock 19
 Heckler & Koch G3
 Heckler & Koch G36

 Heckler & Koch HK53
 Heckler & Koch Mk23
 Heckler & Koch MP5
 Heckler & Koch HK 416
 Pindad SS1
 Pindad SS2
 Pindad SS2-V5C
 QBZ-95
 Remington 700
 SIG Sauer P226/P228
 SIG Sauer SG 552
 SIG Sauer SG 550 Sniper
 Steyr AUG
 Uzi
 Škorpion vz. 61
 Walther PPK
 Kriss S.V
 Custom made Fairbairn–Sykes fighting knife
 Ultimax 100

Fighting vehicles

 Casspir MK3
 Pindad Komodo
 Bushmaster
 Land Rover Defender
 Jankel Al-Thalab
 P6 ATAV
 Mamba APC
 First Win
 OKA 4wd
 Light Strike Vehicle (Singapore)
 Bandvagn 206
   SSE P1 PAKCI

Notable members
 Alexander Evert Kawilarang - Founding father of Kopassus
 Mochammad Idjon Djanbi - 1st Kopassus Commander
Feisal Tanjung - Former Commander of the Indonesian National Armed Forces and Former Coordinating Minister for Political, Legal, and Security Affairs.
 Sarwo Edhie Wibowo - 5th Kopassus Commander
 LB Moerdani - Former Commander of the Indonesian National Armed Forces and former Minister of Defence.
 Mung Parhadi Mulyo (id) - 4th Kopassus Commander
 Yogie SM (id) - Former Minister of Home Affairs and Governor of West Java 
 Wismoyo Arismunandar (id) - Former Chief of Staff of the Army
 Agum Gumelar - Politician, former Minister of Transportation, former Minister of Defence and former Head of Football Association of Indonesia
 Prabowo Subianto - Politician, minister of Defense in Joko Widodo's government since 2019
Sutiyoso - Politician, former Governor of Jakarta and head of Indonesian State Intelligence Agency
Luhut Binsar Pandjaitan - Politician, coordinating minister of maritime affairs in Joko Widodo's government since 2016
Muchdi Purwopranjono a politician and former major general.
Abdullah Mahmud Hendropriyono a former general and the first head of Indonesian State Intelligence Agency (BIN), and was general chairman of the Indonesian Justice and Unity Party (PKPI).
Hartomo  (id) former major general and the former head of Strategic Intelligence Agency (BAIS)
Hinsa Siburian served as Chief of National Cyber and Crypto Agency (Indonesian: Badan Siber dan Sandi Negara, BSSN)

In popular culture
Pengkhianatan G30S/PKI, A 1984 Indonesian docudrama written and directed by Arifin C. Noer, produced by G. Dwipayana, and starring Amoroso Katamsi, Umar Kayam, and Syubah Asa. The film was based on an official history of the 30 September Movement (or G30S) coup in 1965 written by Nugroho Notosusanto and Ismail Saleh, which depicted the coup as being orchestrated by the Communist Party of Indonesia (or PKI).
Merah Putih Memanggil,  A 2017 Indonesian movie directed by Mirwan Suwarso and starring Maruli Tumpubolon. The film depicted hostage rescue situation.
Patriot, mini-series in Net TV in 2016 starring Rizky Hanggono about a group commando liberation village.
Balibo, an Australian film dedicated to Roger East and Balibo Five shows this unit as the ones murdering the Five and executing Roger East.

See also
Kopaska
Kopasgat
Garda Muda Penegak Integrasi, an Indonesian paramilitary group

Notes

References

Further reading

External links
 Kopassus official website
  Mabes TNI-AD: Kopassus
 Specialoperations.com report
 Specwarnet.com report
 Globalsecurity.org report
 "South African mercenaries helped KOPASSUS", by Peter Cronau, Pacific Journalism Review
 Background on Kopassus and Brimob
 Indonesian Forces Tapped by Obama for Renewed US Aid Implicated in New Assassinations - video report by Democracy Now!
 Photos

Army units and formations of Indonesia
Special forces of Indonesia
Military units and formations established in 1952
Airborne units and formations
Special forces units and formations